The 1960 AFC Asian Cup was the 2nd edition of the men's AFC Asian Cup, a quadrennial international football tournament organised by the Asian Football Confederation (AFC). The finals were hosted by South Korea from 14 October to 23 October 1960. The final tournament was organised on a round robin basis, and host country South Korea won with a perfect record of three wins.

Venues

Qualification

Squads

Results 
All times are Korea Standard Time (UTC+9)

Winners

Goalscorers 

With four goals, Cho Yoon-Ok is the top scorer in the tournament. In total, 19 goals were scored by 13 different players, with none of them credited as own goal.

4 goals
 Cho Yoon-ok
2 goals

 Shlomo Levi
 Moon Jung-sik
 Woo Sang-kwon

1 goal

 Amnon Aharonskind
 Rafi Levi
 Avraham Menchel
 Nahum Stelmach
 Luk Man Wai
 Yiu Cheuk Yin
 Choi Chung-min
 Nguyễn Văn Tú
 Trần Văn Nhung

References

External links
Jovanoic, Bojan; Morrison, Neil; Panahi, Majeed; Veroeveren, Pieter. "Asian Nations Cup 1960". RSSSF.

 
AFC Asian Cup tournaments
AFC
Afc Asian Cup, 1960
AFC Asian Cup
International association football competitions hosted by South Korea
October 1960 sports events in Asia